Amor de nadie (English title: Nobody's Love) is a Mexican telenovela produced by Carla Estrada for Televisa in 1990.

Lucía Méndez starred as protagonist, together with Fernando Allende, Saúl Lisazo and Bertín Osborne.

Cast 

 Lucía Méndez as Sofía Hernández
 Saúl Lisazo as Luis
 Bertín Osborne as Óscar Navarro
 Fernando Allende as Guillermo Santiesteban
 Joaquín Cordero as Raúl Santiesteban
 Susana Alexander as Julieta de Santiesteban
 Fernando Sáenz as Edmundo
 Alejandra Maldonado as Vera
 Lupita Lara as Amelia
 Irma Lozano as Betty
 Germán Robles as Velarmino
 Raquel Morell as Gilda Sand
 Margarita Sanz as Margarita "Maggie" Santiesteban
 Anna Silvetti as Nancy
 Elizabeth Katz as Ivette
 Mónica Miguel as Socorro Hernández
 José Elías Moreno as Jorge
 Patricia Pereyra as Sabrina
 Rosario Zúñiga as Marcelina
 Arsenio Campos as Jesús
 Bárbara Córcega as Emma
 Magda Karina as Elisa Hernández
 Javier Ruán as Renato Molinari
 Olivia Bucio as Lena
 Gerardo Murguía as Jaime
 Miguel Pizarro as Pablo Hernández
 Aurora Alonso as Terencia
 Rosenda Bernal as Evangelina
 José María Torre as Ricardo "Richie" Santiesteban
 Mimí as Perla
 Yolanda Ventura as Astrid
 Gloria Morell as Julita
 Alicia Montoya as Anna
 Patricia Martínez as Zenaida
 César Balcazar as Federico
 Roberto Blandón as Carlos
 Ada Carrasco as Cony
 Aurora Clavel as Bertha
 Lucha Moreno as Almendra
 Angelina Peláez as Chana
 Luis Couturier as Gustavo
 Fernando Casanova as Alberto
 Mario García González as Ramírez
 Nadia Haro Oliva as Marie
 Lily Inclán as Adriana
 José Juan as El Coronel
 Rodolfo Landa as Sergio
 Sergio Basañez as Mario
 Arturo Lorca as Pepe
 Isabel Martínez "La Tarabilla" as Laureana
 Bertha Moss as Victoria
 Adalberto Parra as Baltazar
 Ana María Aguirre as Lila
 Mónica Prado as Cynthia
 Teo Tapia as Ramiro
 Blanca Torres as Santa
 Luis Arcaraz Jr. as Félix
 Roberto Bonet as Rodolfo
 Raúl Izaguirre as Eduardo
 Marina Marín as Ofelia
 Ismael Larumbe as Román Hernández
 Rodolfo de Alejandre as Casimiro
 Ángeles Bravo as Pilar
 Kokin Li as Cristóbal
 Jaime Jiménez Pons as Roberto
 Karla Talavera as Sofía (child)
 Jesús Israel as Edmundo (child)
 Héctor Pons as Pablo (child)
 Fernando Leal as Román (child)
 Flor Mariana as Emma (child)/Lily
 Luis Alfredo Rodríguez as Richie (5 years old)
 Osvaldo Silva

Awards and nominations

References

External links 
 

1990 telenovelas
Mexican telenovelas
1990 Mexican television series debuts
1991 Mexican television series endings
Spanish-language telenovelas
Television shows set in Mexico City
Television shows set in Spain
Television shows set in Paris
Televisa telenovelas